Juan Isidro del Bosque Márquez (born 9 December 1961) is a Mexican politician affiliated with the PRI. He currently serves as Deputy of the LXII Legislature of the Mexican Congress representing Veracruz. He serves as Deputy since 4 April 2013 filling the vacant of Juan Manuel Diez Francos.

References

1961 births
Living people
Politicians from Veracruz
Institutional Revolutionary Party politicians
21st-century Mexican politicians
Deputies of the LXII Legislature of Mexico
Members of the Chamber of Deputies (Mexico) for Veracruz